The Arkansas Valley League is a high school athletic conference for several rural high schools along the Arkansas River Valley in southeastern Colorado.

Member schools
Holly Junior-Senior High School — Holly, Colorado 
Cheyenne Wells High School — Cheyenne Wells, Colorado 
Granada Undivided High School — Granada, Colorado 
 Walsh High School — Walsh, Colorado 
Springfield High School (Colorado) — Springfield, Colorado 
Wiley High School — Wiley, Colorado 
McClave High School — Bent County, Colorado  
Eads High School — Eads, Colorado

See also
Colorado High School Activities Association (CHSAA)

External links
Colorado High School sports. Max Preps (MaxPreps.com)

Colorado high school sports conferences
Education in Baca County, Colorado
Education in Bent County, Colorado
Education in Cheyenne County, Colorado
Education in Kiowa County, Colorado
Education in Prowers County, Colorado